Woodinville is a city in King County, Washington, United States. It is a part of the Seattle metropolitan area. There is also a much larger population with Woodinville mailing addresses in adjacent unincorporated areas of King (Cottage Lake) and Snohomish (Maltby) counties. Woodinville has waterfront parks on the Sammamish River, sweeping winery and brewery grounds, and densely wooded areas.

History
Prior to European-American settlement, the Woodinville area was inhabited by the native Sammamish people. Indigenous peoples had occupied the area for thousands of years.

In 1871, Ira Woodin and his wife Susan moved from Seattle and traveled up the Sammamish River where they built a cabin. They planned to log timber and farm cattle. A town gradually developed around them. Their cabin served as its first school and post office, with Susan Woodin appointed as postmaster. Woodin and his son-in-law Thomas Sanders set up the first general store.

Like other nearby towns, Woodinville began as a logging community and became a farming center in the early decades of the 20th century. After World War II, it developed as a suburb of Seattle. In 1969, rock bands including Led Zeppelin and The Guess Who performed at the Seattle Pop Festival at Woodinville's Gold Creek Park.

The growth of Bothell in the early 1990s led to plans for it to annex Woodinville; the residents of Woodinville responded by voting for incorporation in 1992. Woodinville was officially incorporated on March 31, 1993.

In the late 1990s, Woodinville attempted to annex the adjacent community of Grace in Snohomish County. The county's government and the State Boundary Review Board rejected the proposal, citing the loss of tax revenue and legal issues with providing policing due to Woodinville's contracts with the King County Sheriff's Office. The area was also considered for a branch campus of the University of Washington that was ultimately built in Bothell.

Geography

Woodinville is located east of Bothell and northeast of Kirkland in northern King County.

The United States Postal Service identifies those homes in the 98072 and 98077 zip codes as being within Woodinville, though those zip codes exceed the city limits of Woodinville. The 98072 zip code extends north into unincorporated Snohomish County and east of the city limits. The 98077 zip code falls entirely outside the city limits of Woodinville to the east, though the postal service still identifies it as Woodinville, WA.

Surrounding cities and unincorporated areas

Transportation

The Woodinville Subdivision, a spur railroad operated by BNSF Railway, was used for freight and occasional passenger use until it was decommissioned in 2008. The Spirit of Washington Dinner Train, serving the Columbia Winery, ran until July 31, 2007. The railroad was acquired by the Port of Seattle in 2009 and sold to various local governments for use as a regional pedestrian and cyclist trail, known as the Eastside Rail Corridor or Eastrail. The corridor was also proposed for use by a commuter rail service to connect Woodinville to Bellevue and other Eastside destinations, but was determined to be too costly.

The Woodinville Park and Ride is in Downtown Woodinville off 140th Ave NE. It is served by both Sound Transit and King County Metro Transit.

Government and Police

Woodinville contracts with the King County Sheriff's Office for law enforcement services. Deputies assigned to Woodinville wear city uniforms and drive patrol cars marked with the city logo. There are currently 9 patrol officers, one school resource officer, one sergeant and one chief assigned full-time to the city.

Neighborhoods
The Woodinville city government has defined eleven geographic neighborhoods within the city limits .
 East Wellington - Primarily low-density, single-family residential area on the eastern edge of the city
 Lower West Ridge - a mix of light industry and residential, extending southward to the west of the Sammamish River Valley.
 North Industrial - a mix of light industry and commercial developments east of Highway 522, extending towards the former community of Grace
 Reinwood Leota - residential neighborhoods in northeast Woodinville
 Tourist District - area of several wineries (SilverLake Winery, Chateau Ste. Michelle, Columbia Winery, Novelty Hill & Januik Winery, DeLille Cellars, Brian Carter Cellars, JM Cellars), The Herbfarm restaurant, and the Willows Lodge.
 Town Center - the retail center of Woodinville, including several shops and restaurants as well as some housing.
 Upper West Ridge - residential neighborhoods along the western edge of the city.
 Valley Industrial - a mix of industrial businesses along the Sammamish River Valley.
 Wedge - wedge-shaped residential neighborhood west of Highway 522.
 West Wellington - low-density residential neighborhoods
 Woodinville Heights - a mix of single-family and multi-family residences near the town center

Education

Most of Woodinville is served by the Northshore School District; however, the extreme southwestern portions of the city lie within the Lake Washington School District. To serve the city, Northshore School District has one high school (Woodinville High School), two middle schools, and six elementary schools. Lake Washington School District has two elementary schools that serve some Woodinville neighborhoods.

In addition to public schools, the city has several private schools and alternative education options, including a Montessori school, a branch of the Bellevue Christian School, and the Chrysalis School.

Civic events
Civic events in Woodinville include:
 Celebrate Woodinville Summer Concerts & Festival at DeYoung Park & various downtown locations
 Celebrate Woodinville Winterfest, including a 5k & 10k, Street Fair, and Downtown Tree Lighting

Demographics

2010 census
As of the census of 2010, there were 10,938 people, 4,478 households, and 2,827 families residing in the city. The racial makeup of the city was 80.2% White, 1.4% African American, 0.4% Native American, 11.2% Asian, 0.2% Pacific Islander, 2.6% from other races, and 4.0% from two or more races. Hispanic or Latino of any race were 7.3% of the population.

There were 4,478 households, of which 32.2% had children under the age of 18 living with them, 51.9% were married couples living together, 8.2% had a female householder with no husband present, 3.0% had a male householder with no wife present, and 36.9% were non-families. 30.2% of all households were made up of individuals, and 10.4% had someone living alone who was 65 years of age or older. The average household size was 2.43 and the average family size was 3.07.

The median age in the city was 38.9 years. 23.7% of residents were under the age of 18; 7.1% were between the ages of 18 and 24; 29.4% were from 25 to 44; 28.7% were from 45 to 64; and 11.1% were 65 years of age or older. The gender makeup of the city was 48.7% male and 51.3% female.

2000 census

The median income for a household in the city in 2000 was $68,114, and the median income for a family was $81,251. Males had a median income of $53,214 versus $35,404 for females. The per capita income for the city was $31,458. 4.4% of the population and 2.7% of families were below the poverty line. 4.7% of those under the age of 18 and 1.9% of those 65 and older were living below the poverty line.

Based on per capita income, one of the more reliable measures of affluence, Woodinville ranked 34th of 522 areas in the state of Washington to be ranked by the 2000 Census.

Economy
Woodinville's economy is a mix of light industrial, retail, and tourism. Woodinville is increasingly known for its local wineries, which showcase wines from grapes grown in Eastern Washington including Chateau Ste. Michelle (well known for their popular summer concert series), Columbia Winery and dozens of other smaller ones. There are approximately 130 wineries in and near Woodinville. The Woodinville Tourist District is also home to several fine restaurants including The Herbfarm "destination" restaurant. The downtown area includes Molbak's Garden and Home, a nationally acclaimed garden center.

From 1992 to 2007, the Spirit of Washington Dinner Train traveled from Renton to the Columbia Winery in Woodinville. The service was moved to Tacoma and later ceased operations. At the time of the shutdown, the operator had proposed extending the dinner train service north from Woodinville to Snohomish.

Woodinville also contains the headquarters of SaltWorks, a gourmet salt company.

Notable people
 Brooke Butler, film and television actress
 Andre Dillard, professional American football player
 Anu Garg, author and speaker
 Caleb Hamilton, professional baseball player
 Peg Phillips, actress (most well-known for Northern Exposure) and founder of the Woodinville Repertory Theatre
 Theodore Rinaldo, charismatic religious leader, businessman, and convicted child sex offender
 Richard Sanders, actor and writer best known for playing news director Les Nessman on WKRP in Cincinnati.
 Marques Tuiasosopo, former NFL quarterback and assistant college football coach
 Marc Wilson, former NFL quarterback currently living in Woodinville
 Nancy Wilson, musician and guitarist of the band Heart

City landmarks
The City of Woodinville has designated the following landmarks:

See also
 Woodinville wine country
 Paradise Lake (Washington)

References

External links

 

 
Cities in King County, Washington
Cities in the Seattle metropolitan area
Populated places established in 1870
Former census-designated places in Washington (state)
1870 establishments in Washington Territory
Cities in Washington (state)